The gospels demonstrate the homelessness of Jesus lasting for the entirety of his public ministry. He left the economic security he had as an artisan and the reciprocity he had with his family and wandered Palestine depending on charity. Many of the people on whom he depended for charity were women. Because his ministry took place in the vicinity of his disciples' hometowns, it is likely that the group often slept at the homes of the disciples' family members.

Scriptural analysis
Of the Four Evangelists, Luke emphasizes Jesus' homelessness the most. Matthew 8:20 and  both record a statement by Jesus in which he describes his homelessness by saying that "foxes have holes and the birds of the air have nests, but the son of man has nowhere to lay his head". The implication is that the scribe who has just offered to become a follower of Jesus should also expect the same. Theologian John Gill noted a parallel between this saying and the Jews' expectation of the Messiah: "if he (the Messiah) should come, 'there's no place in which he can sit down'.

Interpretation
Sophiologists interpreted Jesus' homelessness as the homelessness of Sophia. New Monastic writer Shane Claiborne refers to Jesus as "the homeless rabbi". Catholic theologian Rosemary Radford Ruether discusses Jesus' homelessness in relation to the concept of kenosis, the voluntary renunciation of power in order to submit to the will of God. In a book length study on the Gospel of Matthew, Robert J. Myles has argued that the homelessness of Jesus is often romanticized in biblical interpretation in a way that obscures the destitution and lack of agency that would have likely accompanied the situation.

Canadian sculptor Tim Schmalz created Jesus the Homeless, a 2013 bronze sculpture of Jesus lying on a park bench covered in a blanket with his wounded feet protruding.

References

Bibliography

Homeless people
Life of Jesus in the New Testament